Federal Medical Centre, Yenagoa is a federal government of Nigeria medical centre located in Yenagoa, Bayelsa State, Nigeria. The current chief medical director is Dennis Allagoa.

History 
Federal Medical Centre, Yenagoa was established in 1957. The hospital was formerly known as General Hospital, Yenagoa.

CMD 
The current chief medical director is Dennis Allagoa.

References 

Hospitals in Nigeria